Mughal architecture is the type of Indo-Islamic architecture developed by the Mughals in the 16th, 17th and 18th centuries throughout the ever-changing extent of their empire in the Indian subcontinent. It developed from the architectural styles of earlier Muslim dynasties in India and from Iranian and Central Asian architectural traditions, particularly Timurid architecture. It also further incorporated and syncretized influences from wider Indian architecture, especially during the reign of Akbar (r. 1556–1605). Mughal buildings have a uniform pattern of structure and character, including large bulbous domes, slender minarets at the corners, massive halls, large vaulted gateways, and delicate ornamentation; examples of the style can be found in modern-day Afghanistan, Bangladesh, India and Pakistan.

The Mughal dynasty was established after the victory of Babur at Panipat in 1526. During his five-year reign, Babur took considerable interest in erecting buildings, though few have survived. His grandson Akbar built widely, and the style developed vigorously during his reign. Among his accomplishments were Agra Fort, the fort-city of Fatehpur Sikri, and the Buland Darwaza. Akbar's son Jahangir commissioned the Shalimar Gardens in Kashmir.

Mughal architecture reached its zenith during the reign of Shah Jahan, who constructed Taj Mahal, the Jama Masjid, the Shalimar Gardens of Lahore, the Wazir Khan Mosque, and who renovated the Lahore Fort. The last of the great Mughal architects was Aurangzeb, who built the Badshahi Mosque, Bibi Ka Maqbara, Moti Masjid etc.

Features 

Mughal architecture incorporates Hindu elements with Persian and Islamic elements. Some features common to many buildings are:
Large bulbous onion domes, sometimes surrounded by four smaller domes.
 Use of white marble and red sandstone.
 Use of delicate ornamentation work, including pachin kari decorative work and jali-latticed screens.
 Monumental buildings surrounded by gardens on all four sides.
 Mosques with large courtyards.
 Persian and Arabic calligraphic inscriptions, including verses from the Quran.
 Large gateways leading up to the main building.
Iwans on two or four sides.
Use of decorative chhatris.
Use of jalis and jharokhas.
Mughal architecture has also influenced later Indian architectural styles, including the Indo-Saracenic style of the British Raj, the Rajput style and the Sikh style.

Monuments

Akbar

Agra Fort

Agra fort is a UNESCO world heritage site in Agra, Uttar Pradesh. The major part of Agra fort was built by Akbar from 1565 to 1574. The architecture of the fort clearly indicates the free adoption of the Rajput planning and construction. Some of the important buildings in the fort are Jahangiri Mahal built for Jahangir and his family, the Moti Masjid, and Mena Bazaars. The Jahangiri Mahal is an impressive structure and has a courtyard surrounded by double-storeyed halls and rooms.

Humayun's Tomb 

Humayun's tomb is the tomb of the Mughal Emperor Humayun in Delhi, India. The tomb was commissioned by Humayun's first wife and chief consort, Empress Bega Begum (also known as Haji Begum), in 1569-70, and designed by Mirak Mirza Ghiyas and his son, Sayyid Muhammad, Persian architects chosen by her. It was the first garden-tomb on the Indian subcontinent. It is often regarded as the first mature example of Mughal architecture.

Fatehpur Sikri

Akbar's greatest architectural achievement was the construction of Fatehpur Sikri, his capital city near Agra at a trade and Jain pilgrimages.  The construction of the walled city was started in 1569 and completed in 1574.

It contained some of the most beautiful buildings – both religious and secular which testify to the Emperor's aim of achieving social, political and religious integration.  The main religious buildings were the huge Jama Masjid and small Tomb of Salim Chisti. Buland Darwaza, also known as the Gate of Magnificence, was built by Akbar in 1576 to commemorate his victory over Gujarat and the Deccan. It is 40 metres high and 50 metres from the ground. The total height of the structure is about 54 metres from ground level.

The Haramsara, the royal seraglio in Fatehpur Sikri was an area where the royal women lived. The opening to the Haramsara is from the Khwabgah side separated by a row of cloisters. According to Abul Fazl, in Ain-i-Akbari, the inside of Harem was guarded by senior and active women, outside the enclosure the eunuchs were placed, and at a proper distance there were faithful Rajput guards.

Jodha bai Palace is the largest palace in the Fatehpur Sikri seraglio, connected to the minor haramsara quarters. The main entrance is double storied, projecting out of the facade to create a kind of porch leading into a recessed entrance with a balcony. Inside there is a quadrangle surrounded by rooms. The columns of rooms are ornamented with a variety of Hindu sculptural motifs.

Tomb of Salim Chisti

The Tomb of Salim Chishti is famed as one of the finest examples of Mughal architecture in India, built during the years 1580 and 1581. The tomb, built in 1571 in the corner of the mosque compound, is a square marble chamber with a verandah. The cenotaph has an exquisitely designed lattice screen around it. It enshrines the burial place of the Sufi saint, Salim Chisti (1478 – 1572), a descendant of Khwaja Moinuddin Chishti of Ajmer, who lived in a cavern on the ridge at Sikri. The mausoleum, constructed by Akbar as a mark of his respect for the Sufi saint, who foretold the birth of his son.

Jahangir

Begum Shahi Mosque

The Begum Shahi Mosque is an early 17th-century mosque situated in the Walled City of Lahore, Pakistan. The mosque was built between 1611 and 1614 during the reign of Mughal Emperor Jahangir by his mother, Mariam-Uz-Zamani, and is Lahore's earliest dated Mughal-era mosque. It is known for its exquisite fresco decoration of geometric and floral motifs painted on stucco, along with inscriptions of the names of God. The mosque would later influence construction of the larger Wazir Khan Mosque a few decades later.

Tomb of I'timād-ud-Daulah

The tomb of I'timād-ud-Daulah, is a mausoleum in the city of Agra in the Indian state of Uttar Pradesh. Often described as a "jewel box", sometimes called the "Bachcha Taj", as the tomb of I'timād-ud-Daulah is often regarded as a draft of the Taj Mahal.

Shah Jahan

Rather than building huge monuments like his predecessors to demonstrate their power, Shah Jahan built elegant monuments. The force and originality of this previous building style gave way under Shah Jahan to a delicate elegance and refinement of detail, illustrated in the palaces erected during his reign at Agra, Delhi and Lahore. Some examples include the Taj Mahal at Agra, the tomb of his wife Mumtaz Mahal. The Moti Masjid (Pearl Mosque) in the Agra Fort and the Jama Masjid at Delhi are imposing buildings of his era, and their position and architecture have been carefully considered so as to produce a pleasing effect and feeling of spacious elegance and well-balanced proportion of parts. Shah Jahan also renovated buildings such as the Moti Masjid, Sheesh Mahal and Naulakha pavilion, which are all enclosed in the Lahore Fort. He also built a mosque named after himself in Thatta called Shahjahan Mosque (not built in the Mughal architecture, but in Safavid and Timurid architecture that were influenced by the Persian architecture). Shah Jahan also built the Red Fort in his new capital at Shah Jahanabad, now Old Delhi. The red sandstone Red Fort is noted for its special buildings-Diwan-i-Aam and Diwan-i-Khas. Another mosque was built during his tenure in Lahore called Wazir Khan Mosque, by Shaikh Ilm-ud-din Ansari who was the court physician to the emperor. It is famous for its rich embellishment which covers almost every interior surface.

Taj Mahal

The Taj Mahal, a World Heritage Site was built between 1632 and 1653 by the emperor Shah Jahan in memory of his wife Mumtaz Mahal . Its construction took 22 years and required 22,000 laborers and 1,000 elephants, at a cost of 32 million rupees. (corresponding to US$ 827 million in 2015) It is a large, white marble structure standing on a square plinth and consists of a symmetrical building with an iwan (an arch-shaped doorway) topped by a large dome and finial.

The building's longest plane of symmetry runs through the entire complex except for the sarcophagus of Shah Jahan, which is placed off centre in the crypt room below the main floor. This symmetry is extended to the building of an entire mirror mosque in red sandstone, to complement the Mecca-facing mosque placed to the west of the main structure. Parchin kari, a method of decoration on a large scale-inlaid work of jewels and Jali work has been used to decorate the structure.

Wazir Khan Mosque

The Wazir Khan Mosque was commissioned during the reign of the Mughal Emperor Shah Jahan in 1634, and completed in 1642. Considered to be the most ornately decorated Mughal-era mosque, Wazir Khan Mosque is renowned for its intricate faience tile work known as kashi-kari, as well as its interior surfaces that are almost entirely embellished with elaborate Mughal-era frescoes. The mosque has been under extensive restoration since 2009 under the direction of the Aga Khan Trust for Culture and the Government of Punjab.

Shalimar Gardens

It is a Mughal garden complex located in Lahore, capital of the Pakistani province of Punjab. The gardens date from the period when the Mughal Empire was at its artistic and aesthetic zenith. Construction of the gardens began in 1641 during the reign of Emperor Shah Jahan, and was completed in 1642. In 1981 the Shalimar Gardens were inscribed as a UNESCO World Heritage Site as they embody Mughal garden design at the apogee of its development.

Shah Jahan Mosque

The Shah Jahan Mosque is the central mosque for the city of Thatta, in the Pakistani province of Sindh. The mosque commissioned by Shah Jahan, who bestowed it to the city as a token of gratitude. Its style is heavily influenced by Central Asian Timurid architecture, which was introduced after Shah Jahan's campaigns near Balkh and Samarkand. The mosque is considered to have the most elaborate display of tile work in South Asia, and is also notable for its geometric brick work - a decorative element that is unusual for Mughal-period mosques.

Shahi Hammam

Shahi Hammam is a Persian-style bath which was built in Lahore, Pakistan, in 1635 C.E. during the reign of Emperor Shah Jahan. It was built by chief physician to the Mughal Court, Ilam-ud-din Ansari, who was widely known as Wazir Khan. The baths were built to serve as a waqf, or endowment, for the maintenance of the Wazir Khan Mosque.

Aurangzeb
In Aurangzeb's reign (1658–1707) squared stone and marble was replaced by brick or rubble with stucco ornament. Srirangapatna and Lucknow have examples of later Indo-Mughal architecture. He made additions to the Lahore Fort and also built one of the thirteen gates which were later named after him (Alamgir).

Badshahi Mosque

The Badshahi Mosque in Lahore, Pakistan, was commissioned by the sixth Mughal Emperor Aurangzeb. Constructed between 1671 and 1673, it was the largest mosque in the world upon construction. It is the third-largest mosque in Pakistan and the seventh-largest mosque in the world. The mosque is adjacent to the Lahore Fort and is the last in the series of congregational mosques in red sandstone. The red sandstone of the walls contrasts with the white marble of the domes and the subtle intarsia decoration. Aurangzeb's mosque's architectural plan is similar to that of his father, Shah Jahan, the Jama Masjid in Delhi; though it is much larger. It also functions as an idgah. The courtyard which spreads over 276,000 square feet, can accommodate one hundred thousand worshippers; ten thousand can be accommodated inside the mosque. The Mosque is one of the most famous Mughal structures but suffered greatly under the reign of Maharaja Ranjit Singh. In 1993, the Government of Pakistan included the Badshahi Mosque in the tentative list for UNESCO World Heritage Site.

Additional monuments

Additional monuments from this period are associated with women from Aurangzeb's imperial family. The construction of the elegant Zinat al-Masjid in Daryaganj was overseen by Aurangzeb's second daughter Zinat-al-Nissa. Aurangzeb's sister Roshan-Ara who died in 1671. The tomb of Roshanara Begum and the garden surrounding it were neglected for a long time and are now in an advanced state of decay.

Bibi ka Maqbara
Bibi Ka Maqbara  was a mausoleum built by Emperor Aurangzeb, in the late 17th century as a loving tribute to his first wife, Dilras Bano Begum in Aurangabad, Maharashtra. Some accounts suggest that later it was taken care by Azam Shah, son of aurangzeb. It is a replica of the Taj Mahal, and was designed by Ata-Ullah, the son of Ahmed Lahori, who was the principal designer of the Taj Mahal.

Late Mughal

Lalbagh Fort

Lalbagh Fort (also known as "Fort Aurangabad"), a Mughal palace fortress at the Buriganga River in the southwestern part of Dhaka, Bangladesh, whose construction started in 1678 during the reign of Aurangzeb's son Azam Shah.

Sunehri Mosque

Sunehri Mosque is a late Mughal-era mosque in the Walled City of Lahore, Pakistan. Sunehri Mosque was built in 1753 when the empire was in decline, during the reign of Muhammad Shah.

Tomb of Safdar Jang
The Tomb of Safdar Jung completed in 1754 is one of the last examples of Mughal Architecture.

Gardens 

Mughal gardens are gardens built by the Mughals in the Islamic style. This style was influenced by Persian gardens. They are built in the char bagh structure, which is a quadrilateral garden layout based on the four gardens of Paradise mentioned in the Qur'an. This style is intended to create a representation of an earthly utopia in which humans co-exist in perfect harmony with all elements of nature.

The quadrilateral garden is divided by walkways or flowing water into four smaller parts. Significant use of rectilinear layouts are made within the walled enclosures. Some of the typical features include pools, fountains and canals inside the gardens.

Some famous examples of Mughal gardens are the Bagh-e-Babur at Kabul, Mehtab Bagh gardens at the Taj Mahal, gardens at Humayun's Tomb, Shalimar Gardens at Lahore, Wah Gardens in Wah , Khusro Bagh at Prayagraj, as well as Pinjore Gardens at Haryana.

The ensemble of six Mughal Gardens of Jammu and Kashmir (Pari Mahal, Nishat Bagh, Shalimar Bagh, Chashme Shahi, Verinag Garden, Achabal Gardens) are on the tentative list of UNESCO World Heritage Sites in India.

Bridges

Shahi Bridge, Jaunpur was constructed during the reign of the Mughal Emperor Akbar.
Mughal Emperor Akbar ordered the construction of the Shahi Bridge, which was completed in the year 1568–69 by Munim Khan. It took four years to complete the bridge. It was designed by Afghan architect Afzal Ali.

Gallery

See also

Indo-Islamic architecture
Indo-Persian culture

References

Sources 
 
 
 

 
Indian architectural styles
Islamic architecture
16th-century architecture
17th-century architecture
18th-century architectural styles
Mathematics and art